The First on the List is a 2011 Italian comedy film directed by Roan Johnson.

The film is based on a real event involving the anarchist singer-songwriter Pino Masi and his friend Renzo Lulli in 1970.

Cast
Claudio Santamaria as Pino Masi
Francesco Turbanti as Renzo Lulli
Paolo Cioni as Fabio Gismondi
Sergio Pierattini as Renzo's father
Daniela Morozzi as Renzo's mother
Fabrizio Brandi as Fabio's father
Anna Maria Seravesi as Fabio's mother
Guglielmo Favilla as a student
Silvio Vannucci as Aldo Moro

References

External links

2011 films
2010s Italian-language films
2011 comedy films
Italian comedy films
Films directed by Roan Johnson
Films shot in Tuscany
Films set in Pisa
Depictions of Aldo Moro on film
2010s Italian films